The  is a commuter electric multiple unit (EMU) train type operated by the private railway operator Meitetsu in Japan since 2004.

3300 series

Design

Formations
, five four-car sets were in operation, formed as shown below, with two motored ("M") cars and two non-powered trailer ("T") cars.

 The two motored cars are each fitted with one single-arm pantograph.

Interior
Passenger accommodation consists mostly of transverse seating with some longitudinal bench seats.

Special liveries
In January 2015, sets 3303 and 3304 were decorated to mark the 400th anniversary of the death of Tokugawa Ieyasu. Each car is decorated with vinyls representing the four seasons. The two trains are scheduled to carry these liveries until 31 December 2015.

History

First introduced in 2004, five four-car sets were built by 2005. A sixth set, 3306, was delivered in January 2015. A seventh set, 3307, was delivered in August 2015. This set differs from earlier sets in having the revised livery applied to 3150 series set 3167.

3150 series

Design

Formations
, 16 two-car sets were in operation, formed as shown below, with one driving motored ("Mc") car and one non-powered driving trailer ("Tc") car.

 The "Mc" car is fitted with one single-arm pantograph.

Interior
Passenger accommodation in the early sets consists mostly of transverse seating with some longitudinal bench seats, while sets 3155 onwards have longitudinal seating throughout.

History

The trains were first introduced in 2004.

Two new sets, 3167 and 3168, were delivered in April and May 2015 respectively. These sets feature a revised livery.

References

External links

 Meitetsu 3150/3300 series 
 Nippon Sharyo information 

Electric multiple units of Japan
3300 series
Train-related introductions in 2004
Nippon Sharyo multiple units
1500 V DC multiple units of Japan